{{DISPLAYTITLE:C26H37NO2}}
The molecular formula C26H37NO2 (molar mass: 395.58 g/mol, exact mass: 395.2824 u) may refer to:

 A-40174 (SP-1)
 AM404, or N-arachidonoylaminophenol

Molecular formulas